A rocket-assisted projectile (RAP) is a cannon, howitzer, mortar, or recoilless rifle round incorporating a rocket motor for independent propulsion. This gives the projectile greater speed and range than a non-assisted ballistic shell, which is propelled only by the gun's exploding charge. Some forms of rocket-assisted projectiles can be outfitted with a laser-guide for greater accuracy.

History

The German Sturmtiger (1944) used a 380 mm Rocket Propelled Round as its main projectile. The gun first accelerated the projectile to 45 m/s (150 ft/s), the 40 kg (88 lb) rocket charge then boosted this to about 250 m/s (820 ft/s).

Also the German Krupp K5 railway gun of World War 2 used rocket assisted projectiles in the later stages of the war, although it also used conventional artillery projectiles.

The Belgian Army was the only NATO member army that did not require RAP, reaching the required range with a conventional round.

The XM1113 RAP round replaced the M549A1 RAP round for the M777 howitzer and other 155mm artillery after 2016. The new round had a range of 24 miles (40km) instead of the 30km NATO standard then extant. As of 2016, the XM1113 was scheduled for Limited Rate Initial Production in Fiscal Year 2022.

See also
Base bleed rounds, another way to extend artillery range
Extended Range Guided Munition, a 127 mm round that was to be used in existing 5" guns
Long Range Land Attack Projectile, a 155 mm round for the Advanced Gun System that uses a rocket motor to increase range

References

External links
GlobalSecurity.org Rocket Assisted Projectiles page includes RAP projects from around the world.
 Army researchers add power, range to artillery Picatinny Arsenal

Rocket artillery
Artillery ammunition